Menlo may refer to:

Geography
Menlo, County Galway, Ireland
Menlo Park (disambiguation), multiple places

United States
Menlo, Georgia
Menlo, Iowa
Menlo, Kansas
Menlo, Washington

Institutions
Menlo College, Atherton, California
Menlo School, an independent, private college preparatory school in Atherton, California
Menlo-Atherton High School, California

Other uses
Menlo Worldwide, a global supply chain company based in California
Menlo (typeface), shipped with Mac OS X
Chevrolet Menlo

See also
Menlough
Menlo Park (disambiguation)